"Hot Child in the City" is a song by English-Canadian musician Nick Gilder. It was released in June 1978 as a single from the album City Nights. It went to No. 1 both in Canada (October 14, 1978) and in the United States (October 28, 1978).  It was not his first No. 1 single: as the lead singer of Sweeney Todd, he had hit No. 1 in Canada on June 26, 1976 (in the RPM listing) with the single "Roxy Roller", which remained at the top for three weeks. He won 2 Juno Awards in Canada and a People's Choice Award in the US. According to The Billboard Book of Number 1 Hits it held the record for taking the longest amount of time to reach No. 1.  The song became a platinum record.

Content
Despite the song's innocent and catchy pop stylings, the tune is based on Gilder's experiences witnessing child prostitution in Los Angeles.  "I've seen a lot of young girls, 15 and 16, walking down Hollywood Boulevard with their pimps. Their home environment drove them to distraction so they ran away, only to be trapped by something even worse. It hurts to see that so I tried writing from the perspective of a lecher – in the guise of an innocent pop song."

Chart history

Weekly charts

Year-end charts

All-time charts

Award successions

See also
List of Hot 100 number-one singles of 1978 (U.S.)

References

1978 singles
Billboard Hot 100 number-one singles
Cashbox number-one singles
RPM Top Singles number-one singles
Song recordings produced by Mike Chapman
Songs written by Nick Gilder
Nick Gilder songs
Works about child prostitution
1977 songs
Chrysalis Records singles
Juno Award for Single of the Year singles